Xenomigia fassli is a moth of the family Notodontidae. It is found in Colombia.

The length of the forewings is about 22 mm. Adults have long and broad wings and the forewings are strongly mottled with white.

References

Moths described in 1918
Notodontidae of South America